Lemuelites were a subdivision of Lamanites, a purported people of the ancient Americas referenced in the Book of Mormon. To save time and prevent confusion, those who sought to destroy Nephi's people were often just called Lamanites.

Origins
In the journey in the wilderness, there is a reference to Lemuel, older brother of Nephi younger brother of Laman, marrying one of the daughters of Ishmael.  Also in the Wilderness the wives of the Lehi group bear children; There we have the beginnings of Lemuel's family, though not referenced as having been called Lemuelites until the ministry of Jacob.

Other references
During the missionary efforts of Ammon there is a reference to some Lemuelites being converted. Also again there is a reference to them being compounded under the name Lamanites and that Lamanites are made up of Lemuelites, Lamanites, Ishmaelites and dissenters from the Nephites, as in Mormon's time as well. After the space of the generations of peace, a group called Lemuelites are among those to break away from the church and reject the gospel.

References

Book of Mormon peoples
Book of Mormon words and phrases
Mormonism and Native Americans